Canarium scalariforme is a species of sea snail, a marine gastropod mollusk in the family Strombidae, the true conchs.

Description

Distribution
This species occurs in the Indian Ocean off the Mascarene Basin.

Phylogeny

In 2006, Latiolais and colleagues proposed a cladogram (a tree of descent) that attempts to show the phylogenetic relationships of 34 species within the family Strombidae. The authors analysed 31 species in the genus Strombus including Canarium haemastoma (referred to as Strombus haemastoma in their analysis), and three species in the allied genus Lambis. The cladogram was based on DNA sequences of both nuclear histone H3 and mitochondrial cytochrome-c oxidase I (COI) protein-coding gene regions. In this proposed phylogeny, Strombus labiatus (= Canarium labiatum) and Strombus microurceus are closely related and appear to share a common ancestor.

References

 Duclos, P.L. (1833). Strombe. Strombus. Lamarck. Magasin de Zoologie. 3: pl. 28
 Walls, J.G. (1980). Conchs, tibias and harps. A survey of the molluscan families Strombidae and Harpidae. T.F.H. Publications Ltd, Hong Kong
 Kronenberg, G. C. (2015). A note on Strombus scalariformis (Caenogastropoda, Strombidae). Basteria 79: 32-38

External links
 Sowerby, G. B., II. (1842-1887). Thesaurus Conchyliorum: Or monographs of genera of shells. London, privately published: vol. 1: p. 1-438, pl. 1-91 [cover date 1847; vol. 2: p. 439 899, pl. 92-186 [cover date 1855]; vol. 3: p. 1-331, pl. 187-290 [cover date: 1866]; vol. 4 p. 1-110, pl. 292-423 [cover date 1880]; vol. 5: p. 1-305, pl. 424-517]

Strombidae
Gastropods described in 1842